A rat trap is a trap designed to catch rats.

Rat Trap or Rattrap may also refer to:

"Rat Trap", a 1978 song by the Boomtown Rats
The Rat Trap, a 1918 play by Noël Coward
Rat Trap (audio drama), a Doctor Who audio drama
Rat Trap (film), a 1963 French film
Elippathayam (The Rat Trap), a 1981 Indian film
Rat Trap (novel), a 1976 novel by Craig Thomas
Rattrap (Transformers), a fictional character from the Transformers toyline
Rat-Trap (video game) or Krusty's Fun House, a 1992 video game
"Rat Traps", an episode of All Grown Up